Kim Un-ju ( or  ; born 9 April 1993 in Pyongyang) is a North Korean football player that plays for the North Korea women's national football team. She played in the 2011 FIFA Women's World Cup.

International goals

References

External links 
 

North Korean women's footballers
1993 births
Living people
2011 FIFA Women's World Cup players
Asian Games medalists in football
Footballers at the 2014 Asian Games
North Korea women's international footballers
Asian Games gold medalists for North Korea
Women's association footballers not categorized by position
Medalists at the 2014 Asian Games
21st-century North Korean women